An uncontested election is an election in which the number of candidates is the same as or fewer than the number of places available for election, so that all candidates are guaranteed to be elected. An uncontested single-winner election is one where there is only one candidate. In some uncontested elections, the normal process, of voters casting ballots and election official counting votes, is cancelled as superfluous and costly; in other cases the election proceeds as a formality. There are some election systems where absence of opposing candidates may not guarantee victory; possible factors are a quorum or minimum voter turnout; a none of the above option; or the availability of write-in candidates on the ballot.

Preventing automatic election
Running without opponents is not always a guarantee of winning. 

Many elections require that the winner has not only the most votes of all candidates, but also either a minimum number of votes or minimum fraction of votes cast, which may apply if many voters cast blank votes or spoiled votes. If elections require a minimum voter turnout, then  abstention may likewise invalidate the election and trigger a fresh election. Some elections allow a "none of the above" option for the same purpose, and some allow voters to add write-in candidates to the ballot, so the pre-printed candidate is not truly uncontested.

In the Philippines, the sole candidate in an uncontested election must have at least one vote in order to win the seat; this is also true in general elections in the United States. There are cases in local government races where the sole candidate on the ballot finished with zero votes and thus have lost an uncontested election; this is because almost all U.S. government seats require candidates to reside in the municipality they seek to represent, and means the candidate themselves must, usually out of forgetfulness or lack of time on election day, fail to vote for themselves. In such cases, the other members of the body usually appoint someone to the vacant seat. 

This does not apply in primary elections: if only one candidate qualifies for a party's nomination, the primary is scratched and the candidate is declared nominated.

Single-winner elections
An uncontested single-winner election may be termed a walkover, a term originating in horse racing. Election walkovers are called acclamation in Canada.

In communist states, elections have often involved a single candidate of the ruling Communist Party; compulsory voting for such candidates reinforce the party's hegemony and increase democratic participation and awareness.  In illiberal democracy, walkovers may be a suspicious sign of electoral fraud, or gerrymandering to prevent other candidates from participating. 

In a two-party system, a walkover may be the sign of a very strong mandate or unanimous support. Sometimes an opposing party will nominate a paper candidate to provide nominal opposition, or  the opposition boycotts the election and a ruling party supporter provides a paper opponent to prevent a walkover, as in four Northern Ireland by-elections in 1986.

Many liberal democracies in history, including the United States, have had uncontested elections because support for one candidate was so strong. In the United States presidential elections of 1788-89 and 1792, George Washington ran uncontested for President, though in the latter election the ballot for the Vice President was contested by both Federalists and Democratic-Republicans. In the 1820 election, James Monroe also ran unopposed, though New Hampshire elector William Plumer cast a vote for John Quincy Adams as a symbolic measure. 

In the UK House of Commons, the outgoing Speaker's constituency was traditionally not contested until the 1960s, as a symbol of the Speaker's political neutrality. Otherwise, the last uncontested Commons elections were in four Northern Ireland constituencies with large Ulster Unionist Party majorities, in the 1951 United Kingdom general election and ensuing by-elections. 

During the World Wars, several by-elections were uncontested, with the candidate of the outgoing MP's party winning by default. This was both a cost-saving emergency measure at a time of war coalition government, and a gesture of solidarity if the by-election was triggered by a war-related death.

Multi-party systems that have held uncontested presidential elections include Germany, Singapore, Ireland, Algeria, Iceland, and Zimbabwe.

In the United States, there has been a trend over time whereby uncontested seats in U.S. Congress have declined but uncontested seats in state legislatures has increased.

Non-party elections
In civic organisations and civic societies, where personal charisma and personal politics often dominate, while parties or factions are often interested in a seat, they may not contest a seat that is being held by a long-standing or very popular individual, for fear of being seen as "rocking the boat". In elections for these societies, there is often "pre-election politics" where candidates attempt to figure out who is running for which positions; in this cat and mouse game, elected positions are thus often effectively decided by internal politics before a single vote is cast.

Multiple-winner elections
Irish town councils were elected from 1919 to 2009 by single transferable vote; in many cases the entire town formed a single nine-seat local electoral area. Where there were nine or fewer candidates, no election contest was held and all eligible candidates deemed elected without a vote. This happened in 1960 in three urban districts and six towns with commissioners.

See also
 Ballot access

References

Elections